Samuel or Salomon Lipschütz (July 4, 1863 in Ungvár – November 30, 1905 in Hamburg) was a chess player and author. He was chess champion of the United States from 1892 to 1894.

Biography

Born in Ungvár, Ung County, Carpathian Ruthenia, Austria-Hungary (now Uzhhorod, Ukraine), Lipschütz emigrated to New York City in 1880 at the age of seventeen. He soon became known in chess circles and in 1883 he was chosen as one of a team to represent the New York Chess Club in a match with the Philadelphia Chess Club, and won both of his games. In 1885 he won the championship of the New York Chess Club, and the next year he took part in the international tournament held in London, where he came sixth, including wins over Johannes Zukertort and George Henry Mackenzie. At the Sixth American Chess Congress held in New York in 1889, Lipschütz again finished sixth and was the only American player among the prize winners. Lipschütz won the U.S. Chess Championship in 1892 by defeating Jackson Whipps Showalter in a match by seven wins to one with one draw. He secured for the Manhattan Chess Club the absolute possession of the "Staats-Zeitung" challenge cup by winning New York State Chess Association matches and tournaments three times. In 1900 he won the Sexangular Tournament at the Manhattan Chess Club ahead of Frank Marshall and Showalter. Lipschütz played Emanuel Lasker twice and drew both games. Several games played by Lipschütz were published in Examples of Chess Master-Play (New Barnet, 1893).

Lipschütz wrote a 122-page American Appendix to The Chess-Player's Manual (Gossip, 1888) and edited The Rice Gambit, New York, 1898. An anonymous reviewer of The Chess-Player's Manual in the New York Times praised "Mr. Lipschütz's appendix, which brings the development of the openings almost down to date". David Hooper and Kenneth Whyld write in The Oxford Companion to Chess that Lipschütz's appendix "helped to make this one of the standard opening books of the time".

William Ewart Napier recalled Lipschütz as a "frail little man, with a gentlemanly mien and manners and an extravagantly long, pointed nose—the Cyrano of Chess". According to Arthur Bisguier and Andrew Soltis, "He was a methodical attacker with some strikingly good positional ideas—and some terrible ones." As an example of the former, they quote his 1889 theoretical novelty in the Ruy Lopez, 1.e4 e5 2.Nf3 Nc6 3.Bb5 d6 4.Bxc6+ bxc6 5.d4 f6!, which World Champion Wilhelm Steinitz praised as an "excellent and novel idea". Afflicted by tuberculosis, Lipschütz left New York several times for health reasons, principally staying in Santa Fe (1893), Los Angeles (1893–95) and Florida (1904). In 1904 he travelled to Hamburg for treatment, where he had a series of operations but did not survive the treatment.

Notes

See also
 List of Jewish chess players

References

Footnotes

External links

“S. Lipschütz – Samuel, Simon or Solomon?” by Edward Winter

1863 births
1905 deaths
Sportspeople from Uzhhorod
Ukrainian Jews
Austro-Hungarian emigrants to the United States
American people of Ukrainian-Jewish descent
American chess players
Jewish chess players
American chess writers
American male non-fiction writers
19th-century chess players